Frédéric Bonin-Pissarro or Frédéric Pissarro (born in 1964 in Paris) is a French painter. Since 2002, he has been a citizen of the United States.

Family 

Frédéric Bonin-Pissarro is the son of Sylvie and Claude Bonin-Pissarro, also a painter. He is a great-grandson of the "father of Impressionism"  Camille Pissarro. His sister is named Lila. Married, he has 3 sons whose first is the actor Louka Meliava.

Biography  
Frederic began learning the art of painting with his father. Jean Edelmann also exerted a major influence on his style. In 1983–1984 Frédéric Bonin-Pissarro studied at the Ecole de Sèvres, then from 1984 to 1988 he studied at the École nationale supérieure des beaux-arts (ENSBA). There, he attended masterclasses  of Jacques Yankel and of Antonio Segui. After his studies, he settled in Cincinnati (Ohio, USA). In 1989–90, Bonin-Pissarro worked on stage sets for the Théâtre Populaire des Cévennesin Paris. From 1991 to 1994, he drew up various projects for the Planète Magique amusement park in Paris. From 1995 to 1997, he taught at the art school  Faire in Gisors. Since 1998, he has taught setting color, character design, writing scenario, illustration, composition and layout at the Art Institute of Cincinnati (AIC College of Design). In 2009, The Art Institute of Cincinnati has conferred him an associate degree in graphic design. He obtained a Bachelor of Arts and a Master in Arts, with mention summa cum laude from the Morehead State University in 2015 and 2017 respectively.

In 2017, he was appointed Visiting Lecturer at College of Fine Arts of University of Nevada, Las Vegas.

Works 

Frédéric Bonin-Pissarro first enrolled in the Neo-Impressionist painting, to which he incorporated elements of fauvisme; then by adopting a clear line and more pronounced colors, his compositions have become more complex; patterns, dots and lines have appeared in his works, now considered part of the modern Abstract Art. His early paintings show the expressive face of representations of wildlife art and still life with oil paintings or acrylic. He himself describes his style as "expressive figurative ".

Pictorial works (selection)  

 Mouffetard St Market, Paris
 Two Minds, One Vision
 Cow Love
 Keeping It Together
 The Flip Side Of Love
 Urban Bird
 Sending Love
 Happy Projections
 Innocence
 Lady With Bird
 Modern Beauty
 Petit Mother
 Doubletake
 Family Bliss
 Takes Two To Tango
 Family Love
 Peace With Nature
 Love Bird
 Connected
 Maternite
 Amaman
 Modern Family
 Complex Relationships
 Party Bird

Exhibitions (selection) 

Frédéric Bonin-Pissarro has exhibited at the following exhibitions:

 Salon des Indépendants, Société des Artistes Indépendants; Paris 1990
 Salon Comparaison; Paris 1992
 Salon de May, Paris 1993
 Salon de Mars; Paris 1993
 Salon de Bagneux (juried); Paris 1994
 Galerie de Synthese; Paris 1994
 Galerie de Beaux-Arts, Paris 1994
 Salon de Vitry; Paris 1995
 Galerie du C.R.O.U.S.; Paris 1996
 Galerie Jeanne Masson, Paris 1997
 Opus Gallery; Cleveland (Ohio) 1998
 Marquette Gallery, Cincinnati (Ohio) 1998
 Gallery Adrienne; San Francisco (Califirnia) 1999
 Fourway Gallery; Martha's Vineyard (Massachusetts) 1999
 Debruyne Gallery; Naples (Florida) 2000
 Art Factory; Rockford (Illinois) 2000
 Wally Findlay Gallery; Chicago (Illinois) 2001
 Marquette Gallery; Madeira (Ohio) 2001
 Wally Findlay Gallery; Chicago, New York, Palm Beach, London 2002–2009
 Titus Fine Art; Beverly Hills (California) 2005–2012
 The Pinacle; East Tsimshatsui (Hong Kong) 2011
 Festival International d'Art Singulier Contemporain, Grand Baz'Art à Bézu; Bézu-Saint-Éloi 2011
 Musee Prive; Paris 2011
 Outsider Gallery; French Town (New Jersey) 2011
 Greenwich Gallery; Cincinnati (Ohio) 2011
 Kings Wood Art Print Edition, dreijähriger Vertrag 2012
 Inauguration Galerie 30; Cannes 2012
 The Nursery Rhyme Project, Curator of Dion Hitchings; New Jersey 2012
 Gallery Artisti; Paris 2012
 Commission for last Pei building, Bangkok 2012
 Lille International Contemporary Art Fair (10 Gemälde), Lille 2012
 Acala Gallery (Einzelausstellung); Bangkok 2012
 The TOY Show, kuratiert von Dion Hitchings; New Jersey 2012
 Artop Gallery, Lille 2013

Publications 

Frédéric Bonin-Pissarro made illustrations for the following books:
 Matt Ackermann: Antoine's Ault Park Adventure. 2008
 Missy Griffin : Gigi's Window. 2010
  Marion K. Allman" Hi! My Name is Casey. 2010

Prize  
The Key of the City of Cincinnati in 2001

References

External links

 Photos d'œuvres de l'artiste → online
 Artiste → site online

Pissarro family
1964 births
21st-century American painters
21st-century French male artists
20th-century French painters
20th-century French male artists
French male painters
21st-century French painters
American people of French-Jewish descent
American people of Portuguese-Jewish descent
French contemporary painters
French graphic designers
French people of Portuguese-Jewish descent
Living people
École des Beaux-Arts alumni
American male painters
University of Nevada, Las Vegas faculty